The 2002 Cleveland Indians season was the 102nd season for the franchise. The 2002 Major League Baseball season  began on March 31, 2002.The team finished third in the American League Central Division behind the Minnesota Twins and the Chicago White Sox.

Offseason
 November 7, 2001: Chris Coste was signed as a free agent by the Indians.
 November 7, 2001: Jason Beverlin was signed as a free agent by the Indians.
 November 26, 2001: Donzell McDonald was signed as a free agent by the Indians.
 December 11, 2001: Roberto Alomar, Mike Bacsik and Danny Peoples (minors) were traded by the Indians to the New York Mets for Matt Lawton, Alex Escobar, Jerrod Riggan and players to be named later. The Mets completed the deal by sending Earl Snyder and Billy Traber to the Indians on December 13.
 December 18, 2001: John Rocker was traded by the Indians to the Texas Rangers for Dave Elder.
February 9, 2002: Bruce Aven was signed as a free agent with the Cleveland Indians.
March 28, 2002: Donzell McDonald was assigned by the Indians to the Kansas City Royals.

Regular season

Opening Day starters

 Matt Lawton – RF
 Omar Vizquel – SS
 Ellis Burks – DH
 Jim Thome – 1B
 Travis Fryman – 3B
 Ricky Gutiérrez – 2B
 Milton Bradley – CF
 Russell Branyan – LF
 Einar Díaz – C
 Bartolo Colón – SP

Season standings

American League Wild Card

Record vs. opponents

Notable transactions
 June 4, 2002: Jeremy Guthrie was drafted by the Indians in the 1st round (22nd pick) of the 2002 Major League Baseball draft. Player signed on October 3, 2002.
 June 7, 2002: Russell Branyan was traded by the Indians to the Cincinnati Reds for Ben Broussard.
June 25, 2002: Bruce Aven was traded by the Indians to the Philadelphia Phillies for Jeff D'Amico.
 June 27, 2002: Bartolo Colón and Tim Drew were traded by the Indians to the Montreal Expos for Grady Sizemore, Cliff Lee, Brandon Phillips, and Lee Stevens.
 July 28, 2002: Paul Shuey was traded by the Indians to the Los Angeles Dodgers for Ricardo Rodríguez, Terry Mulholland, and Francisco Cruceta.
 August 16, 2002: Jason Beverlin was selected off waivers from the Indians by the Detroit Tigers.

Roster

Game log

|- bgcolor="#bbffbb"
| 1 || March 31 || @ Angels || 6–0 || Colón (1–0) || Washburn (0–1) || || Edison International Field of Anaheim || 42,697 || 1–0 || W1
|-

|- bgcolor="#ffbbbb"
| 2 || April 2 || @ Angels || 5–7 || Weber (1–0) || Riske (0–1) || Percival (1) || Edison International Field of Anaheim || 20,055 || 1–1 || L1
|- bgcolor="#bbffbb"
| 3 || April 3 || @ Angels || 6–5 || Drese (1–0) || Sele (0–1) || Wickman (1) || Edison International Field of Anaheim || 18,194 || 2–1 || W1
|- bgcolor="#ffbbbb"
| 26 || April 30 || Angels || 2–21 || Ortiz (2–3) || Sabathia (2–3) || || Jacobs Field || 24,286 || 13–13 || L3
|-

|- bgcolor="#ffbbbb"
| 27 || May 1 || Angels || 2–7 || Washburn (3–2) || Drese (2–3) || || Jacobs Field || 23,536 || 13–14 || L4
|- bgcolor="#ffbbbb"
| 28 || May 2 || Angels || 0–8 || Appier (3–1) || Finley (2–3) || || Jacobs Field || 26,068 || 13–15 || L5
|-

|- bgcolor="#bbffbb"
| 78 || June 28 || Diamondbacks || 8–2 || Sabathia (6–6) || Batista (4–5) || || Jacobs Field || 42,586 || 37–41 || W1
|- bgcolor="#ffbbbb"
| 79 || June 29 || Diamondbacks || 2–4 || Anderson (3–7) || Finley (4–10) || Kim (20) || Jacobs Field || 42,466 || 37–42 || L1
|- bgcolor="#ffbbbb"
| 80 || June 30 || Diamondbacks || 2–5 || Schilling (13–3) || Báez (6–6) || || Jacobs Field || 42,221 || 37–43 || L2
|-

|- bgcolor="#ffbbbb"
| 120 || August 16 || @ Angels || 4–5 || Lackey (5–2) || Drese (9–9) || Percival (29) || Edison International Field of Anaheim || 41,356 || 53–67 || L2
|- bgcolor="#bbffbb"
| 121 || August 17 || @ Angels || 9–4 || Sadler (1–0) || Washburn (15–4) || || Edison International Field of Anaheim || 39,866 || 54–67 || W1
|- bgcolor="#ffbbbb"
| 122 || August 18 || @ Angels || 1–4 || Appier (11–9) || Sabathia (8–10) || Percival (30) || Edison International Field of Anaheim || 41,059 || 54–68 || L1
|-

|- style="text-align:center;"
| Legend:       = Win       = Loss       = PostponementBold = Indians team member

|-align="center" bgcolor="#bbffbb"
| 1 || March 31 || @ Angels || 6–0  || Colón (1–0) || Washburn (0–1) || || 42,697 || 1–0
|-

|-align="center" bgcolor="ffbbbb"  
| 2 || April 2 || @ Angels || 7–5  || Weber (1–0) || Riske (0–1) || Percival (1) || 20,055 || 1–1
|-align="center" bgcolor="#bbffbb"
| 3 || April 3 || @ Angels || 6–5  || Drese (1–0) || Sele (0–1) || Wickman (1) || 18,194 || 2–1
|-align="center" bgcolor="#bbffbb"
| 4 || April 5 || @ Tigers || 10–1 || Báez (1–0) || Redman (0–1) || || 41,248 || 3–1
|-align="center" bgcolor="#bbffbb"
| 5 || April 6 || @ Tigers || 5–3  || Colón (2–0) || Cornejo (0–1) || Wickman (2) || 19,754 || 4–1
|-align="center" bgcolor="#bbffbb"
| 6 || April 7 || @ Tigers || 5–1  || Sabathia (1–0) || Weaver (0–1) || Wickman (3) || 14,749 || 5–1
|-align="center" bgcolor="#bbffbb"
| 7 || April 8 || Twins || 9–5  || Drese (2–0) || Milton (1–1) || || 42,441 || 6–1
|-align="center" bgcolor="#bbffbb"
| 8 || April 9 || Twins || 5–4  || Finley (1–0) || Mays (0–2) || Wickman (4) || 23,760 || 7–1
|-align="center" bgcolor="#bbffbb"
| 9 || April 10 || Twins || 9–3  || Báez (2–0) || Reed (1–1) || || 25,420 || 8–1
|-align="center" bgcolor="#bbffbb"
| 10 || April 11 || Twins || 8–4  || Colón (3–0) || Lohse (0–1) || || 25,582 || 9–1
|-align="center" bgcolor="#bbffbb"
| 11 || April 12 || Royals || 3–1  || Sabathia (2–0) || Suppan (1–1) || Wickman (5) || 29,970 || 10–1
|-align="center" bgcolor="#bbffbb"
| 12 || April 13 || Royals || 8–7  || Shuey (1–0) || Bailey (0–2) || || 28,455 || 11–1
|-align="center" bgcolor="#bbbbbb"
| -- || April 14 || Royals || colspan=6|Postponed (rain)
|-align="center" bgcolor="ffbbbb"  
| 13 || April 16 || @ White Sox || 10–5 || Marte (1–0) || Finley (1–1) || || 23,502 || 11–2
|-align="center" bgcolor="ffbbbb"  
| 14 || April 17 || @ White Sox || 7–2  || Buehrle (4–0) || Báez (2–1) || || 15,561 || 11–3
|-align="center" bgcolor="ffbbbb"  
| 15 || April 18 || @ White Sox || 7–1  || Ritchie (1–1) || Colón (3–1) || || 13,880 || 11–4
|-align="center" bgcolor="ffbbbb"  
| 16 || April 19 || @ Twins || 12–3 || Lohse (1–1) || Sabathia (2–1) || || 23,491 || 11–5
|-align="center" bgcolor="ffbbbb"  
| 17 || April 20 || @ Twins || 6–2  || Kinney (1–0) || Drese (2–1) || || 30,146 || 11–6
|-align="center" bgcolor="ffbbbb"  
| 18 || April 21 || @ Twins || 4–2  || Reed (2–1) || Finley (1–2) || Guardado (8) || 22,264 || 11–7
|-align="center" bgcolor="#bbffbb"
| 19 || April 22 || White Sox || 4–2  || Báez (3–1) || Buehrle (4–1) || Wickman (6) || 24,519 || 12–7
|-align="center" bgcolor="ffbbbb"  
| 20 || April 23 || White Sox || 5–1  || Ritchie (2–1) || Colón (3–2) || || 25,284 || 12–8
|-align="center" bgcolor="ffbbbb"  
| 21 || April 24 || White Sox || 9–2  || Wright (2–2) || Sabathia (2–2) || || 25,935 || 12–9
|-align="center" bgcolor="ffbbbb"  
| 22 || April 25 || White Sox || 6–3  || Garland (3–1) || Drese (2–2) || Foulke (6) || 29,046 || 12–10
|-align="center" bgcolor="#bbffbb"
| 23 || April 26 || @ Rangers || 7–4  || Finley (2–2) || Davis (2–2) || || 33,243 || 13–10
|-align="center" bgcolor="ffbbbb"  
| 24 || April 27 || @ Rangers || 4–2  || Bell (1–0) || Báez (3–2) || Irabu (4) || 43,353 || 13–11
|-align="center" bgcolor="ffbbbb"  
| 25 || April 28 || @ Rangers || 2–1  || Valdez (2–3) || Colón (3–3) || Irabu (5) || 24,118 || 13–12
|-align="center" bgcolor="ffbbbb"  
| 26 || April 30 || Angels || 21–2 || Ortiz (2–3) || Sabathia (2–3) || || 24,286 || 13–13
|-

|-align="center" bgcolor="ffbbbb"  
| 27 || May 1 || Angels || 7–2  || Washburn (3–2) || Drese (2–3) || || 23,536 || 13–14
|-align="center" bgcolor="ffbbbb"  
| 28 || May 2 || Angels || 8–0  || Appier (3–1) || Finley (2–3) || || 26,068 || 13–15
|-align="center" bgcolor="ffbbbb"  
| 29 || May 3 || Rangers || 4–2  || Davis (3–2) || Báez (3–3) || Irabu (7) || 32,846 || 13–16
|-align="center" bgcolor="bbffbb"
| 30 || May 4 || Rangers || 3–0  || Colón (4–3) || Valdez (2–4) || Wickman (7) || 33,788 || 14–16
|-align="center" bgcolor="bbffbb"  
| 31 || May 5 || Rangers || 9–2  || Sabathia (3–3) || Rogers (3–1) || || 31,990 || 15–16
|-align="center" bgcolor="bbffbb"
| 32 || May 6 || @ Orioles || 9–4  || Drese (3–3) || Groom (1–1) || || 24,976 || 16–16
|-align="center" bgcolor="ffbbbb"
| 33 || May 7 || @ Orioles || 4–3  (10) || Julio (2–0) || Wohlers (0–1) || || 26,455 || 16–17
|-align="center" bgcolor="bbffbb"
| 34 || May 8 || @ Orioles || 6–2  || Báez (4–3) || Erickson (3–3) || || 29,361 || 17–17
|-align="center" bgcolor="ffbbbb"
| 35 || May 9 || @ Royals || 5–3  || Suppan (3–4) || Rincón (0–1) || Hernández (2) || 12,555 || 17–18
|-align="center" bgcolor="ffbbbb"
| 36 || May 10 || @ Royals || 9–0  || Reichert (1–3) || Sabathia (3–4) || || 24,279 || 17–19
|-align="center" bgcolor="bbbbbb"
| -- || May 11 || @ Royals ||colspan=6|Postponed (rain)
|-align="center" bgcolor="ffbbbb"
| 37 || May 12 || @ Royals || 4–1  || Byrd (6–2) || Finley (2–4) || Hernández (3) || 10,820 || 17–20
|-align="center" bgcolor="bbffbb"
| 38 || May 14 || Orioles || 6–5  || Shuey (2–0) || Julio (2–2) || || 30,447 || 18–20
|-align="center" bgcolor="bbffbb"
| 39 || May 15 || Orioles || 3–1  || Colón (5–3) || Bauer (1–1) || Wickman (8) || 26,315 || 19–20
|-align="center" bgcolor="ffbbbb"
| 40 || May 17 || Royals || 6–2  || Byrd (7–2) || Finley (2–5) || || 32,593 || 19–21
|-align="center" bgcolor="ffbbbb"
| 41 || May 18 || Royals || 4–2  || Reichert (2–4) || Wickman (0–1) || Hernández (4) || 29,388 || 19–22
|-align="center" bgcolor="bbffbb"
| 42 || May 18 || Royals || 4–1  || Drese (4–3) || May (0–1) || Wickman (9) || 32,110 || 20–22
|-align="center" bgcolor="ffbbbb"
| 43 || May 19 || Royals || 5–4  || Grimsley (2–2) || Wickman (0–2) || Hernández (5) || 31,105 || 20–23
|-align="center" bgcolor="ffbbbb"
| 44 || May 20 || @ Tigers || 4–3  || Santana (3–0) || Rincón (0–2) || Walker (1) || 12,851 || 20–24
|-align="center" bgcolor="ffbbbb"
| 45 || May 21 || @ Tigers || 5–1  || Redman (1–5) || Nagy (0–1) || || 14,442 || 20–25
|-align="center" bgcolor="ffbbbb"
| 46 || May 22 || @ Tigers || 2–0  || Weaver (4–5) || Finley (2–6) || || 14,396 || 20–26
|-align="center" bgcolor="bbffbb"
| 47 || May 24 || @ Blue Jays || 5–2  || Drese (5–3) || Miller (3–2) || Wickman (10) || 16,385 || 21–26
|-align="center" bgcolor="bbffbb"
| 48 || May 25 || @ Blue Jays || 3–0  || Sabathia (4–4) || Loaiza (2–1) || Wickman (11) || 21,589 || 22–26
|-align="center" bgcolor="bbffbb"
| 49 || May 26 || @ Blue Jays || 3–1  || Colón (6–3) || Prokopec (2–7) || || 22,380 || 23–26
|-align="center" bgcolor="ffbbbb"
| 50 || May 27 || Tigers || 4–1  || Redman (2–5) || Báez (4–4) || || 40,652 || 23–27
|-align="center" bgcolor="bbffbb"
| 51 || May 28 || Tigers || 4–2  || Finley (3–6) || Weaver (4–6) || Wickman (12) || 25,028 || 24–27
|-align="center" bgcolor="ffbbbb"
| 52 || May 29 || Tigers || 9–5  || Sparks (3–5) || Riske (0–2) || Acevedo (7) || 26,156 || 24–28
|-align="center" bgcolor="bbffbb"
| 53 || May 30 || Tigers || 11–7 || Riske (1–2) || Lima (1–3) || || 25,689 || 25–28
|-align="center" bgcolor="bbffbb"
| 54 || May 31 || White Sox || 7–0  || Colón (7–3) || Glover (1–1) || || 33,756 || 26–28
|-

|-align="center" bgcolor="bbffbb"
| 55 || June 1 || White Sox || 8–4  || Báez (5–4) || Ritchie (3–7) || || 37,707 || 27–28
|-align="center" bgcolor="bbffbb"
| 56 || June 2 || White Sox || 4–3  || Finley (4–6) || Wright (5–6) || Wickman (13) || 37,760 || 28–28
|-align="center" bgcolor="ffbbbb"
| 57 || June 4 || @ Twins || 23–2 || Reed (6–2) || Drese (5–4) || || 14,029 || 28–29
|-align="center" bgcolor="bbffbb"
| 58 || June 5 || @ Twins || 6–4  || Sabathia (5–4) || Milton (7–5) || Riske (1) || 15,617 || 29–29
|-align="center" bgcolor="ffbbbb"
| 59 || June 6 || @ Twins || 8–3  || Lohse (6–3) || Colón (7–4) || || 15,553 || 29–30
|-align="center" bgcolor="ffbbbb"
| 60 || June 7 || Mets || 4–3  || Leiter (6–5) || Báez (5–5) || Benítez (12) || 39,986 || 29–31
|-align="center" bgcolor="ffbbbb"
| 61 || June 8 || Mets || 8–6  || Trachsel (4–6) || Finley (4–7) || Benítez (13) || 41,474 || 29–32
|-align="center" bgcolor="bbffbb"
| 62 || June 9 || Mets || 8–3  || Drese (6–4) || Estes (2–5) || || 39,436 || 30–32
|-align="center" bgcolor="ffbbbb"
| 63 || June 10 || Phillies || 3–1  || Adams (3–4) || Sabathia (5–5) || Mesa (18) || 28,440 || 30–33
|-align="center" bgcolor="bbffbb"
| 64 || June 11 || Phillies || 5–1  || Colón (8–4) || Wolf (3–5) || Wickman (14) || 30,238 || 31–33
|-align="center" bgcolor="ffbbbb"
| 65 || June 12 || Phillies || 7–3  || Padilla (9–4) || Paronto (0–1) || || 35,783 || 31–34
|-align="center" bgcolor="bbffbb"
| 66 || June 13 || Orioles || 2–1  (10) || Riggan (1–0) || Roberts (3–2) || || 26,745 || 32–34
|-align="center" bgcolor="bbffbb"
| 67 || June 14 || @ Rockies || 5–3  || Drese (7–4) || Thomson (6–6) || Wickman (15) || 40,156 || 33–34
|-align="center" bgcolor="ffbbbb"
| 68 || June 15 || @ Rockies || 7–4  || Jones (1–1) || Paronto (0–2) || Jimenez (18) || 41,870 || 33–35
|-align="center" bgcolor="bbffbb"
| 69 || June 16 || @ Rockies || 5–4  || Colón (9–4) || Neagle (4–4) || Wickman (16) || 40,792 || 34–35
|-align="center" bgcolor="ffbbbb"
| 70 || June 18 || @ Marlins || 4–0  || Dempster (5–6) || Finley (4–8) || || 9,724 || 34–36
|-align="center" bgcolor="ffbbbb"
| 71 || June 19 || @ Marlins || 2–1  || Tavárez (5–3) || Riggan (1–1) || Núñez (16) || 9,428 || 34–37
|-align="center" bgcolor="ffbbbb"
| 72 || June 20 || @ Marlins || 3–0  (6) || Burnett (8–5) || Drese (7–5) || || 8,045 || 34–38
|-align="center" bgcolor="ffbbbb"
| 73 || June 21 || @ Expos || 3–1  || Vázquez (5–3) || Sabathia (5–6) || Stewart (8) || 7,494 || 34–39
|-align="center" bgcolor="bbffbb"
| 74 || June 22 || @ Expos || 5–4  || Colón (10–4) || Day (2–1) || Wickman (17) || 10,180 || 35–39
|-align="center" bgcolor="ffbbbb"
| 75 || June 23 || @ Expos || 7–2  || Armas Jr. (7–7) || Finley (4–9) || || 13,557 || 35–40
|-align="center" bgcolor="bbffbb"
| 76 || June 25 || @ Red Sox || 4–2  || Báez (6–5) || Castillo (5–8) || Wickman (18) || 34,064 || 36–40
|-align="center" bgcolor="ffbbbb"
| 77 || June 26 || @ Red Sox || 7–4  || Martínez (9–2) || Drese (7–6) || Urbina (21) || 32,255 || 36–41
|-align="center" bgcolor="bbffbb"
| 78 || June 28 || Diamondbacks || 8–2  || Sabathia (6–6) || Batista (4–5) || || 42,586 || 37–41
|-align="center" bgcolor="ffbbbb"
| 79 || June 29 || Diamondbacks || 4–2  || Anderson (3–7) || Finley (4–10) || Kim (20) || 42,466 || 37–42
|-align="center" bgcolor="ffbbbb"
| 80 || June 30 || Diamondbacks || 5–2  || Schilling (13–3) || Báez (6–6) || || 42,221 || 37–43
|-

|-align="center" bgcolor="ffbbbb"
| 81 || July 2 || @ Yankees || 10–5 || Mendoza (6–2) || Rincón (0–3) || || 45,589 || 37–44
|-align="center" bgcolor="ffbbbb"
| 82 || July 3 || @ Yankees || 11–8 || Wells (9–5) || Sabathia (6–7) || Rivera (20) || 39,879 || 37–45
|-align="center" bgcolor="ffbbbb"
| 83 || July 4 || @ Yankees || 7–1  || Mussina (12–3) || Finley (4–11) || || 42,909 || 37–46
|-align="center" bgcolor="bbffbb"
| 84 || July 5 || @ White Sox || 4–2  || Báez (7–6) || Garland (7–6) || Wickman (19) || 29,085 || 38–46
|-align="center" bgcolor="ffbbbb"
| 85 || July 6 || @ White Sox || 7–3  || Buehrle (12–6) || Phillips (0–1) || Marte (1) || 25,016 || 38–47
|-align="center" bgcolor="bbffbb"
| 86 || July 7 || @ White Sox || 9–3  || Drese (8–6) || Ritchie (5–11) || || 22,104 || 39–47
|-align="center" bgcolor="ffbbbb"
| 87 || July 11 || Yankees || 7–4  || Pettitte (3–3) || Sabathia (6–8) || Rivera (22) || 41,192 || 39–48
|-align="center" bgcolor="bbffbb"
| 88 || July 12 || Yankees || 2–1  (10) || Wohlers (1–1) || Karsay (3–4) || || 42,518 || 40–48
|-align="center" bgcolor="ffbbbb"
| 89 || July 13 || Yankees || 14–5 || Wells (10–5) || Drese (8–7) || || 42,631 || 40–49
|-align="center" bgcolor="bbffbb"
| 90 || July 14 || Yankees || 10–7 || Rincón (1–3) || Rivera (1–4) || || 42,573 || 41–49
|-align="center" bgcolor="bbffbb"
| 91 || July 15 || White Sox || 7–1  || Phillips (1–1) || Glover (3–5) || || 30,025 || 42–49
|-align="center" bgcolor="ffbbbb"
| 92 || July 16 || White Sox || 5–4  || Osuna (5–1) || Wickman (0–3) || Dámaso Marte (2) || 30,754 || 42–50
|-align="center" bgcolor="ffbbbb"
| 93 || July 17 || Twins || 8–5  || Reed (7–5) || Báez (7–7) || Guardado (30) || 33,324 || 42–51
|-align="center" bgcolor="ffbbbb"
| 94 || July 18 || Twins || 8–6  || Fiore (8–2) || Rincón (1–4) || Guardado (31) || 33,573 || 42–52
|-align="center" bgcolor="ffbbbb"
| 95 || July 19 || @ Royals || 8–5  || Mullen (2–2) || Murray (0–1) || Hernández (18) || 20,922 || 42–53
|-align="center" bgcolor="ffbbbb"
| 96 || July 20 || @ Royals || 7–5  || Hernández (1–0) || Wright (0–1) || Hernández (19) || || 42–54
|-align="center" bgcolor="bbffbb"
| 97 || July 20 || @ Royals || 5–3 (10) || Shuey (3–0) || Voyles (0–2) || Wickman (20) || 36,277 || 43–54
|-align="center" bgcolor="ffbbbb"
| 98 || July 21 || @ Royals || 13–12 (10) || Mullen (3–2) || Murray (0–2) || || 15,637 || 43–55
|-align="center" bgcolor="bbffbb"
| 99 || July 23 || Yankees || 9–3  || Báez (8–7) || Pettitte (4–4) || || 38,520 || 44–55
|-align="center" bgcolor="ffbbbb"
| 100 || July 24 || Yankees || 14–7 || Wells (11–5) || Drese (8–8) || || 38,081 || 44–56
|-align="center" bgcolor="ffbbbb"
| 101 || July 26 || Tigers || 8–5  || Powell (1–0) || Nagy (0–2) || Henriquez (2) || 38,738 || 44–57
|-align="center" bgcolor="ffbbbb"
| 102 || July 27 || Tigers || 5–1  || Sparks (5–10) || Sabathia (6–9) || || 38,622 || 44–58
|-align="center" bgcolor="bbffbb"
| 103 || July 28 || Tigers || 9–6  || DePaula (1–0) || Acevedo (1–5) || || 35,076 || 45–58
|-align="center" bgcolor="bbffbb"
| 104 || July 29 || @ Athletics || 8–6  || Mulholland (1–0) || Magnante (0–2) || Wohlers (1) || 18,297 || 46–58
|-align="center" bgcolor="bbffbb"
| 105 || July 30 || @ Athletics || 5–4  || Drese (9–8) || Lidle (3–9) || Wohlers (2) || 14,737 || 47–58
|-align="center" bgcolor="ffbbbb"
| 106 || July 31 || @ Athletics || 6–4  || Mulder (12–6) || Westbrook (0–1) || Koch (26) || 47,574 || 47–59
|-

|-align="center" bgcolor="ffbbbb"
| 107 || August 1 || @ Mariners || 10–6 || Nelson (2–2) || DePaula (1–1) || || 45,590 || 47–60
|-align="center" bgcolor="ffbbbb"
| 108 || August 2 || @ Mariners || 3–1  || Moyer (11–4) || Báez (8–8) || Sasaki (29) || 45,995 || 47–61
|-align="center" bgcolor="ffbbbb"
| 109 || August 3 || @ Mariners || 12–4 || García (12–7) || Wright (0–2) || || 46,219 || 47–62
|-align="center" bgcolor="bbffbb"
| 110 || August 4 || @ Mariners || 10–8 || Westbrook (1–1) || Sasaki (2–5) || Wohlers (3) || 46,120 || 48–62
|-align="center" bgcolor="bbffbb"
| 111 || August 6 || Devil Rays || 4–2  || Nagy (1–2) || Sosa (1–5) || Wohlers (4) || 35,302 || 49–62
|-align="center" bgcolor="bbffbb"
| 112 || August 7 || Devil Rays || 6–2  || Sabathia (7–9) || Sturtze (1–12) || || 37,888 || 50–62
|-align="center" bgcolor="ffbbbb"
| 113 || August 8 || Devil Rays || 4–2  || Wilson (5–7) || Báez (8–9) || Yan (15) || 29,973 || 50–63
|-align="center" bgcolor="ffbbbb"
| 114 || August 9 || Rangers || 3–2  || Rogers (12–6) || Wohlers (1–2) || Cordero (4) || 41,019 || 50–64
|-align="center" bgcolor="bbffbb"
| 115 || August 10 || Rangers || 4–3  || Wickman (1–3) || Kolb (2–1) || || 37,753 || 51–64
|-align="center" bgcolor="ffbbbb"
| 116 || August 11 || Rangers || 11–5 || Myette (1–4) || Nagy (1–3) || || 36,789 || 51–65
|-align="center" bgcolor="bbffbb"
| 117 || August 13 || @ Devil Rays || 9–5  || Sabathia (8–9) || Sturtze (1–13) || Wohlers (5) || 11,779 || 52–65
|-align="center" bgcolor="bbffbb"
| 118 || August 14 || @ Devil Rays || 6–4  || Báez (9–9) || Wilson (5–8) || Wohlers (6) || 10,455 || 53–65
|-align="center" bgcolor="ffbbbb"
| 119 || August 15 || @ Devil Rays || 4–3  || Harper (5–6) || Wohlers (1–3) || || 10,778 || 53–66
|-align="center" bgcolor="ffbbbb"
| 120 || August 16 || @ Angels || 5–4  || Lackey (5–2) || Drese (9–9) || Percival (29) || 41,356 || 53–67
|-align="center" bgcolor="bbffbb"
| 121 || August 17 || @ Angels || 9–4  || Sadler (1–0) || Washburn (15–4) || || 39,866 || 54–67
|-align="center" bgcolor="ffbbbb"
| 122 || August 18 || @ Angels || 4–1  || Appier (11–9) || Sabathia (8–10) || Percival (30) || 41,059 || 54–68
|-align="center" bgcolor="ffbbbb"
| 123 || August 19 || Athletics || 8–1  || Hudson (10–9) || Báez (9–10) || || 27,696 || 54–69
|-align="center" bgcolor="ffbbbb"
| 124 || August 20 || Athletics || 6–3  || Harang (5–3) || Westbrook (1–2) || Koch (32) || 27,527 || 54–70
|-align="center" bgcolor="ffbbbb"
| 125 || August 21 || Athletics || 6–0  || Lidle (7–9) || Rodríguez (0–1) || || 26,916 || 54–71
|-align="center" bgcolor="ffbbbb"
| 126 || August 22 || Athletics || 9–3  || Mulder (15–7) || Phillips (1–2) || Bradford (2) || 27,759 || 54–72
|-align="center" bgcolor="bbffbb"
| 127 || August 23 || Mariners || 4–2  || Wohlers (2–3) || Baldwin (7–10) || || 33,525 || 55–72
|-align="center" bgcolor="bbffbb"
| 128 || August 24 || Mariners || 5–3  || Mulholland (2–0) || Creek (2–2) || || 38,086 || 56–72
|-align="center" bgcolor="ffbbbb"
| 129 || August 25 || Mariners || 12–4 || García (14–9) || Westbrook (1–3) || || 36,402 || 56–73
|-align="center" bgcolor="bbffbb"
| 130 || August 26 || Tigers || 8–2  || Rodríguez (1–1) || Sparks (8–13) || || 24,344 || 57–73
|-align="center" bgcolor="ffbbbb"
| 131 || August 27 || Tigers || 8–5  || Redman (8–12) || Phillips (1–3) || Acevedo (27) || 24,375 || 57–74
|-align="center" bgcolor="bbffbb"
| 132 || August 28 || Tigers || 2–1  || Sabathia (9–10) || Powell (1–4) || Báez (1) || 25,158 || 58–74
|-align="center" bgcolor="ffbbbb"
| 133 || August 30 || Red Sox || 15–5 || Lowe (18–6) || Wright (0–3) || || 31,986 || 58–75
|-align="center" bgcolor="bbffbb"
| 134 || August 31 || Red Sox || 8–7  || Báez (10–10) || Howry (3–4) || || 37,908 || 59–75
|-

|-align="center" bgcolor="ffbbbb"
| 135 || September 1 || Red Sox || 7–1  || Wakefield (8–5) || Nagy (1–4) || || 34,799 || 59–76
|-align="center" bgcolor="bbffbb"
| 136 || September 2 || @ Tigers || 11–1 || Sabathia (10–10) || Powell (1–5) || || 18,722 || 60–76
|-align="center" bgcolor="ffbbbb"
| 137 || September 3 || @ Tigers || 4–0  || Van Hekken (1–0) || Mulholland (2–1) || || 11,635 || 60–77
|-align="center" bgcolor="bbffbb"
| 138 || September 4 || @ Tigers || 9–3  || Wright (1–3) || Maroth (5–7) || || 12,715 || 61–77
|-align="center" bgcolor="bbffbb"
| 139 || September 5 || @ White Sox || 11–6 || Rodríguez (2–1) || Glover (7–7) || || 12,667 || 62–77
|-align="center" bgcolor="bbffbb"
| 140 || September 6 || @ White Sox || 9–7  || Burba (1–0) || Buehrle (17–10) || Báez (2) || 17,131 || 63–77
|-align="center" bgcolor="bbffbb"
| 141 || September 7 || @ White Sox || 4–2  || Sabathia (11–10) || Garland (10–11) || Wohlers (7) || 16,622 || 64–77
|-align="center" bgcolor="ffbbbb"
| 142 || September 8 || @ White Sox || 7–6  || Osuna (8–2) || Báez (10–11) || || 15,067 || 64–78
|-align="center" bgcolor="ffbbbb"
| 143 || September 9 || Blue Jays || 11–9 || Bowles (1–1) || Sadler (1–1) || Escobar (30) || 28,567 || 64–79
|-align="center" bgcolor="ffbbbb"
| 144 || September 10 || Blue Jays || 5–4  || Bowles (2–1) || Wohlers (2–4) || Escobar (31) || 24,312 || 64–80
|-align="center" bgcolor="ffbbbb"
| 145 || September 11 || Blue Jays || 6–5  (11) || Cassidy (1–4) || Elder (0–1) || Kershner (1) || 26,609 || 64–81
|-align="center" bgcolor="bbffbb"
| 146 || September 12 || Twins || 5–4  || Riggan (2–1) || Mays (3–7) || Báez (3) || 28,649 || 65–81
|-align="center" bgcolor="bbffbb"
| 147 || September 13 || Twins || 12–5 || Mulholland (3–1) || Milton (13–9) || || 30,421 || 66–81
|-align="center" bgcolor="ffbbbb"
| 148 || September 14 || Twins || 3–2  || Reed (15–7) || Sadler (1–2) || Guardado (41) || 32,330 || 66–82
|-align="center" bgcolor="ffbbbb"
| 149 || September 15 || Twins || 5–0  || Lohse (13–8) || Lee (0–1) || || 28,061 || 66–83
|-align="center" bgcolor="ffbbbb"
| 150 || September 16 || @ Red Sox || 6–1  || Martínez (19–4) || Rodríguez (2–2) || || 30,023 || 66–84
|-align="center" bgcolor="bbffbb"
| 151 || September 16 || @ Red Sox || 7–1  || Tallet (1–0) || Castillo (5–15) || || 31,203 || 67–84 
|-align="center" bgcolor="ffbbbb"
| 152 || September 17 || @ Red Sox || 4–2  || Wakefield (11–5) || Sabathia (11–11) || Urbina (36) || 31,760 || 67–85
|-align="center" bgcolor="bbffbb"
| 153 || September 18 || @ Red Sox || 6–4  || Riske (2–2) || Embree (0–2) || Báez (4) || 31,829 || 68–85
|-align="center" bgcolor="bbffbb"
| 154 || September 20 || @ Royals || 6–2  || Davis (1–0) || Obermueller (0–1) || Báez (5) || 13,271 || 69–85
|-align="center" bgcolor="ffbbbb"
| 155 || September 21 || @ Royals || 3–2  || Grimsley (4–6) || Mulholland (3–2) || || 15,448 || 69–86
|-align="center" bgcolor="bbffbb"
| 156 || September 22 || @ Royals || 6–5  || Sabathia (12–11) || Grimsley (4–7) || Báez (6) || 11,177 || 70–86
|-align="center" bgcolor="ffbbbb"
| 157 || September 24 || @ Twins || 4–3  || Hawkins (5–0) || Elder (0–2) || || 21,634 || 70–87
|-align="center" bgcolor="ffbbbb"
| 158 || September 25 || @ Twins || 7–5  (12) || Romero (9–2) || Maurer (0–1) || || 15,314 || 70–88
|-align="center" bgcolor="bbffbb"
| 159 || September 26 || @ Twins || 8–4  || Drese (10–9) || Jackson (2–3) || || 17,772 || 71–88
|-align="center" bgcolor="bbffbb"
| 160 || September 27 || Royals || 8–3  || Sabathia (13–11) || Obermueller (0–2) || || 27,706 || 72–88
|-align="center" bgcolor="bbffbb"
| 161 || September 28 || Royals || 6–5  (10) || Wohlers (3–4) || MacDougal (0–1) || || 31,428 || 73–88
|-align="center" bgcolor="bbffbb"
| 162 || September 29 || Royals || 7–3  || Wright (2–3) || Mullen (4–5) || || 32,018 || 74–88
|-

Player stats

Batting

Starters by position
Note: Pos = Position; G = Games played; AB = At bats; R = Runs scored; H = Hits; 2B = Doubles; 3B = Triples; HR = Home runs; RBI = Runs batted in; AVG = Batting average; SB = Stolen bases

Other batters
Note: G = Games played; AB = At bats; R = Runs scored; H = Hits; 2B = Doubles; 3B = Triples; HR = Home runs; RBI = Runs batted in; AVG = Batting average; SB = Stolen bases

Note: Pitchers' hitting stats are not included above.

Pitching

Starting pitchers
Note: W = Wins; L = Losses; ERA = Earned run average; G = Games pitched; GS = Games started; IP = Innings pitched; H = Hits allowed; BB = Walks allowed; K = Strikeouts

Other pitchers
Note: W = Wins; L = Losses; ERA = Earned run average; G = Games pitched; GS = Games started; SV = Saves; IP = Innings pitched; H = Hits allowed; BB = Walks allowed; K = Strikeouts

Relief pitchers
Note: W = Wins; L = Losses; ERA = Earned run average; G = Games pitched;SV = Saves; IP = Innings pitched; H = Hits allowed; BB = Walks allowed; K = Strikeouts

Awards and honors
Jim Thome, Roberto Clemente Award
All-Star Game

Minor league affiliates

References

2002 Cleveland Indians at Baseball Reference
2002 Cleveland Indians at Baseball Almanac

Cleveland Guardians seasons
Cleveland Indians season
Cleve